Hypostomus macrops is a species of catfish in the family Loricariidae. It is native to South America, where it occurs in the Das Velhas River basin. The species reaches 28.8 cm (11.3 inches) SL and is believed to be a facultative air-breather.

References

macrops
Freshwater fish of Brazil
Fish described in 1888